Annemarie Røstvik Lorentzen (23 September 1921 – 30 June 2008) was a Norwegian politician for the Labour Party. She was the first female Norwegian Minister of Transport and Communications, in addition to being Minister of Consumer Affairs and Administration and Norwegian ambassador to Iceland. Lorentzen played a major role in the post-World War II reconstruction of her Hammerfest after it was razed by the fleeing Nazi occupiers.

She was elected to the Norwegian Parliament from Finnmark in 1969, and was re-elected on one occasion. She had previously served as a deputy representative during the terms 1954–1957 and 1961–1965.

From 1973 to 1977, Lorentzen was appointed to the second cabinet Bratteli. During this period her seat in parliament was taken by Per A. Utsi. She was Minister of Transport and Communications from 1973 to 1976 and Minister of Consumer Affairs and Administration from 1976 to 1978.

She was born in Sør-Varanger, but worked in Hammerfest as a teacher from 1947 to 1969. She was a member of Hammerfest municipal council from 1951 to 1963. From 1961 to 1965 she chaired the regional party chapter of Western Finnmark. From 1961 to 1969 she was a member of the national Labour Party board.

After her time as government minister, she was appointed Norwegian ambassador to Iceland. She served in this capacity from 1978 to 1985.

References

1921 births
2008 deaths
Labour Party (Norway) politicians
Government ministers of Norway
Members of the Storting
Finnmark politicians
Ambassadors of Norway to Iceland
People from Hammerfest
People from Sør-Varanger
Ministers of Transport and Communications of Norway
Women government ministers of Norway
20th-century Norwegian women politicians
20th-century Norwegian politicians
Women members of the Storting
Norwegian women ambassadors